Dunaivtsi is a town (urban-type settlement) in Kamianets-Podilskyi Raion (district), Khmelnytskyi Oblast  (province), Ukraine. Dunaivtsi hosts the administration of Novodunaivtsi settlement hromada, one of the hromadas of Ukraine. According to the 2001 census, its population was 2 755 inhabitants. Current population: 

Until 18 July 2020, Dunaivtsi belonged to Dunaivtsi Raion. The raion was abolished in July 2020 as part of the administrative reform of Ukraine, which reduced the number of raions of Khmelnytskyi Oblast to three. The area of Dunaivtsi Raion was merged into Kamianets-Podilskyi Raion.

A railway station of the Yarmolyntsi—Larga railroad is located in the town. Founded in 1914, Dunaivtsi received the status of the urban-type settlement in 1972.

Dunaivtsi is 22 km from the city of Dunaivtsi.

See also
 Smotrych, the other urban-type settlement in Dunaivtsi Raion

References 

Urban-type settlements in Kamianets-Podilskyi Raion